List of the published work of Barry N. Malzberg, American writer.

Novels
 
1968 Oracle of the Thousand Hands
1969 The Empty People (writing as K. M. O'Donnell)
1970 Dwellers of the Deep (writing as K. M. O'Donnell)
1971 Confessions of Westchester County
1971 Universe Day (writing as K. M. O'Donnell)
1971 The Falling Astronauts 
1971 Gather in the Hall of the Planets (writing as K. M. O'Donnell)
1971 In My Parents' Bedroom
1971 The Spread  
1972 Beyond Apollo
1972 Overlay
1972 The Horizontal Woman  
1972 The Masochist
1972 The Men Inside
1972 Revelations
1973 Phase IV, adapted from the screenplay by Mayo Simon
1973 Herovit's World
1973 In the Enclosure
1973 Tactics of Conquest
1973 Opening Fire
1973 The Way of the Tiger, The Sign of the Dragon  [Kung Fu #1] (writing as Howard Lee)
1974 Tactics of Conquest
1974 The Destruction of the Temple
1974 On a Planet Alien
1974 The Sodom and Gomorrah Business
1974 The Day of the Burning
1974 Underlay
1975 Guernica Night
1975 The Gamesman
1975 Galaxies
1975 Conversations
1976 The Running of Beasts (with Bill Pronzini)
1976 Chorale
1976 Scop
1977 The Last Transaction
1977 Lady of a Thousand Sorrows (writing as Lee W. Mason)
1977 Acts of Mercy (with Bill Pronzini)
1978 Chorale
1979 Night Screams (with Bill Pronzini)
1980 Prose Bowl (with Bill Pronzini)
1982 The Cross of Fire
1985 The Remaking of Sigmund Freud

As "Mike Barry" - The Lone Wolf series
 1973  Night Raider  
 1973  Bay Prowler   
 1973  Boston Avenger   
 1974  Desert Stalker   
 1974  Havana Hit   
 1974  Chicago Slaughter  
 1974  Peruvian Nightmare   
 1974  Los Angeles Holocaust   
 1974  Miami Marauder   
 1975  Harlem Showdown   
 1975  Detroit Massacre   
 1975  Phoenix Inferno   
 1975  The Killing Run  
 1975  Philadelphia Blow-Up

Pseudonymous erotic novels
 1967  Love Doll (Softcover - as Mel Johnson)  
 1968  I, Lesbian (Midwood - as M.L. Johnson)  
 1968  Just Ask (Midwood - as Mel Johnson)  
 1968  Instant Sex (Midwood - as Mel Johnson)  
 1968  Chained (Midwood - as Mel Johnson)  
 1968  Kiss and Run (Midwood - as Mel Johnson)  
 1969  Nympho Nurse (Midwood - as Mel Johnson)  
 1969  The Sadist (Midwood - as Mel Johnson)  
 1969  Diary of a Parisian Chambermaid (Midwood - as Claudine Dumas)  
 1969  Do It To Me (Midwood - as Mel Johnson)  
 1969  Born to Give (Midwood - as Mel Johnson)  
 1969  Campus Doll (Midwood - as Mel Johnson)  
 1969  The Box (Oracle Books - as Mel Johnson)  
 1969  A Way With All Maidens (Oracle Books - as Mel Johnson) 
 1969  The Circle (Olympia Press - as Francine di Natale)  
 1969  Southern Comfort (Olympia Press 460 - as Gerrold Watkins)  
 1970  A Bed of Money (Olympia Press 474 - as Gerrold Watkins)  
 1970  A Satyr's Romance (Olympia Press 476 - as Gerrold Watkins)  
 1970  Giving It Away (Olympia Press 479 - as Gerrold Watkins)  
 1970  The Art of the Fugue (Olympia Press 483 - as Gerrold Watkins)

Collections
1969 Final War: And Other Fantasies (writing as K M O'Donnell)
1971 In the Pocket: And Other SF Stories (writing as K M O'Donnell)
1971 Universe Day (writing as K M O'Donnell)
1974 Out From Ganymede
1975 The Many Worlds of Barry Malzberg
1975 The Best of Barry N. Malzberg
1976 Down Here In The Dream Quarter
1979 Malzberg At Large
1980 The Man Who Loved the Midnight Lady: A Collection
1982 The Engines of the Night: Science Fiction in the Eighties (Essays, with some fiction)
1994 The Passage of the Light-The Recursive Science Fiction of Barry N. Malzberg (with Tony Lewis and Mike Resnick)
2000 In the Stone House
2001 Shiva: And Other Stories
2003 Problems Solved (all stories collaborations with Bill Pronzini). Crippen & Landru
2007 Breakfast in the Ruins (A much expanded version of "The Engines of the Night")
2013 The Very Best of Barry N. Malzberg

Short fiction

Nonfiction
 1982 The Engines of the Night: Science Fiction in the Eighties
 
 2010 The Business of Science Fiction: Two Insiders Discuss Writing and Publishing with Mike Resnick

References

Bibliographies by writer
Bibliographies of American writers
Science fiction bibliographies